Whenuakite is a locality on the Coromandel Peninsula of New Zealand. State Highway 25 runs through it. Whitianga is north west, Coroglen 8 km west, Cooks Beach and Hahei north, Hot Water Beach north east, and Tairua 18 km to the south east. The Whenuakite River flows from coastal hills in the east through the area to drain in the Whitianga Harbour.

Demographics

Mercury Bay South had a population of 1,224 at the 2018 New Zealand census, an increase of 132 people (12.1%) since the 2013 census, and an increase of 54 people (4.6%) since the 2006 census. There were 474 households, comprising 612 males and 612 females, giving a sex ratio of 1.0 males per female. The median age was 49.7 years (compared with 37.4 years nationally), with 192 people (15.7%) aged under 15 years, 165 (13.5%) aged 15 to 29, 585 (47.8%) aged 30 to 64, and 282 (23.0%) aged 65 or older.

Ethnicities were 94.4% European/Pākehā, 10.5% Māori, 2.0% Pacific peoples, 1.7% Asian, and 1.5% other ethnicities. People may identify with more than one ethnicity.

The percentage of people born overseas was 17.9, compared with 27.1% nationally.

Although some people chose not to answer the census's question about religious affiliation, 58.8% had no religion, 28.4% were Christian, 0.2% were Muslim, 0.7% were Buddhist and 2.5% had other religions.

Of those at least 15 years old, 198 (19.2%) people had a bachelor's or higher degree, and 159 (15.4%) people had no formal qualifications. The median income was $28,500, compared with $31,800 nationally. 132 people (12.8%) earned over $70,000 compared to 17.2% nationally. The employment status of those at least 15 was that 483 (46.8%) people were employed full-time, 216 (20.9%) were part-time, and 24 (2.3%) were unemployed.

Education

Notes

External links
Whenuakite School website

Thames-Coromandel District
Populated places in Waikato